The Cupcake Peaks are two rounded peaks, or nunataks, which rise to   southeast of Mount Hamilton in the Churchill Mountains. The allusive name given by the Advisory Committee on Antarctic Names is suggestive of the appearance of the peaks.

References 

Mountains of the Ross Dependency
Shackleton Coast